Mankato is a city in and the county seat of Jewell County, Kansas, United States.  As of the 2020 census, the population of the city was 836.

History
Mankato was originally called Jewell Center, and under the latter name laid out in 1872. It was renamed Mankato in 1880 after Mankato, Minnesota. Mankato was incorporated as a city in 1880.

The first post office in the town was established as Jewell Center in August 1872. The post office was renamed Mankato in April 1880.

Geography
Mankato is located at  (39.787220, -98.209274).

Demographics

2010 census
At the 2010 census there were 869 people in 405 households, including 242 families, in the city. The racial makeup of the city was 97.0% White, 0.3% African American, 0.3% Native American, 0.5% Asian, 0.5% from other races, and 1.4% from two or more races. Hispanic or Latino of any race were 1.0%.

Of the 405 households 22.0% had children under the age of 18 living with them, 50.9% were married couples living together, 6.4% had a female householder with no husband present, 2.5% had a male householder with no wife present, and 40.2% were non-families. 37.5% of households were one person and 18.8% were one person aged 65 or older. The average household size was 2.08 and the average family size was 2.71.

The median age was 51.5 years. 19.2% of residents were under the age of 18; 5% were between the ages of 18 and 24; 17.1% were from 25 to 44; 30.4% were from 45 to 64; and 28.3% were 65 or older. The gender makeup of the city was 48.2% male and 51.8% female.

2000 census
At the 2000 census there were 976 people in 436 households, including 256 families, in the city. The racial makeup of the city was 98.67% White, 0.10% Asian, 0.20% from other races, and 1.02% from two or more races. Hispanic or Latino of any race were 0.92%.

Of the 436 households 24.1% had children under the age of 18 living with them, 52.5% were married couples living together, 5.3% had a female householder with no husband present, and 41.1% were non-families. 39.0% of households were one person and 21.3% were one person aged 65 or older. The average household size was 2.14 and the average family size was 2.86.

The age distribution was 21.8% under the age of 18, 4.5% from 18 to 24, 21.1% from 25 to 44, 23.0% from 45 to 64, and 29.6% 65 or older. The median age was 46 years. For every 100 females, there were 95.2 males. For every 100 females age 18 and over, there were 87.5 males.

The median household income was $29,286 and the median family income  was $41,429. Males had a median income of $30,000 versus $17,813 for females. The per capita income for the city was $17,457. About 4.9% of families and 9.2% of the population were below the poverty line, including 9.0% of those under age 18 and 10.5% of those age 65 or over.

Education
The community is served by Rock Hills USD 107 public school district.  The Rock Hills High School mascot is Grizzlies.

Prior to school unification, Mankato was home to Mankato High School with the mascot Cougars. The Mankato Cougars won the Kansas State High School boys class B basketball championship in 1943.

Notable people

 Wint Smith (1892–1976) Congressman, represented Kansas from 1947 to 1961.
 Ernest Tippin (1890-1958) Olympic sharpshooter.
Gregg Doud, Chief Agricultural Negotiator, Rank of Ambassador, in the Office of the United States Trade Representative, being confirmed March 1, 2018.

In popular culture
On November 3, 2019, YouTubers Yes Theory published a video titled, "Throwing a Party in the Most Boring Town in America." The video features the group visiting Mankato and their quest to throw a party in the town.

References

Further reading

External links

 City of Mankato
 Mankato - Directory of Public Officials
 Mankato city map, KDOT

Cities in Kansas
County seats in Kansas
Cities in Jewell County, Kansas
1872 establishments in Kansas
Populated places established in 1872